Big Jim Mountain is a  mountain summit located in Chelan County of Washington state. Big Jim Mountain is the fourth-highest peak in the Chiwaukum Mountains, a subset of the Cascade Range. Its nearest higher neighbor is Big Lou,  to the south-southwest, and Cape Horn is set  to the west. Precipitation runoff from Big Jim drains into tributaries of the Wenatchee River. Although modest in elevation, relief is significant since Big Jim rises 2,300 feet above Painter Creek Valley in one mile. Big Jim Mountain is named for Jim Whittaker, the first American to summit Mount Everest and twin brother of Lou Whittaker.

Climate

Most weather fronts originate in the Pacific Ocean, and travel east toward the Cascade Mountains. As fronts approach, they are forced upward by the peaks of the Cascade Range, causing them to drop their moisture in the form of rain or snowfall onto the Cascades (Orographic lift). As a result, the Cascades experience high precipitation, especially during the winter months in the form of snowfall. During winter months, weather is usually cloudy, but, due to high pressure systems over the Pacific Ocean that intensify during summer months, there is often little or no cloud cover during the summer. The months June through October offer the most favorable weather for viewing or climbing this peak.

Geology

The Alpine Lakes Wilderness features some of the most rugged topography in the Cascade Range with craggy peaks and ridges, deep glacial valleys, and granite walls spotted with over 700 mountain lakes.  Geological events occurring many years ago created the diverse topography and drastic elevation changes over the Cascade Range leading to the various climate differences.

During the Pleistocene period dating back over two million years ago, glaciation advancing and retreating repeatedly scoured the landscape leaving deposits of rock debris. The last glacial retreat in the Alpine Lakes area began about 14,000 years ago and was north of the Canada–US border by 10,000 years ago. The "U"-shaped cross section of the river valleys are a result of that recent glaciation. Uplift and faulting in combination with glaciation have been the dominant processes which have created the tall peaks and deep valleys of the Alpine Lakes Wilderness area.

See also
List of peaks of the Alpine Lakes Wilderness

References

External links
 Big Jim Mountain weather forecast: Mountain Forecast
Alpine Lakes Wilderness (Okanogan-Wenatchee National Forest) U.S. Forest Service
 Big Lou and Big Jim photo: Flickr

Mountains of Washington (state)
Mountains of Chelan County, Washington
Cascade Range
North American 2000 m summits